was a Japanese mathematician working in algebra and topology.

Morita was born in 1915 in Hamamatsu, Shizuoka Prefecture and graduated from the Tokyo Higher Normal School in 1936. Three years later he was appointed assistant at the Tokyo University of Science. He received his Ph.D. from Osaka University in 1950, with a thesis in topology. After teaching at the Tokyo Higher Normal School, he became professor at the University of Tsukuba in 1951. He held this position until 1978, after which he taught at Sophia University. Morita died of heart failure in 1995 at the Sakakibara Heart Institute in Tokyo; he was survived by his wife, Tomiko, his son, Yasuhiro, and a grandson.

He introduced the concepts now known as Morita equivalence and Morita duality which were given wide circulation in the 1960s by Hyman Bass in a series of lectures. The Morita conjectures on normal topological spaces are also named after him.

Publications

References

1915 births
1995 deaths
People from Hamamatsu
University of Tsukuba alumni
Osaka University alumni
20th-century Japanese mathematicians
Algebraists
Topologists
Academic staff of the University of Tsukuba
Academic staff of Sophia University